Joseph John Kirrene (October 4, 1931 – October 19, 2016) was an American professional baseball player.

Kirrene signed with the White Sox in 1950 and spent his first pro season in the middle levels of minor league baseball before his autumn call-up. On October 1, 1950, the regular season's final day, he started at third base in the second game of a double-header against left-hander Stubby Overmire of the St. Louis Browns. Kirrene had one single in four at bats and was errorless in the field.  Kirrene then was out of baseball for three seasons, and served in the military during the Korean War.  Returning to the game in 1954, he led the Class A Western League in batting average (.343) and was selected as the third baseman on the league's all-star team.

That September he received his final Major League trial. This time, he appeared in nine games for the ChiSox, six as the starting third baseman, and had three multi-hit games.  He drove in four runs and registered his only extra-base hit, a double off Bob Porterfield of the Washington Senators, on September 8, 1954. In 33 total big-league plate appearances, Kirrene had eight hits and five bases on balls, with four runs scored. He also was credited a stolen base.  He played in the higher minors—including both teams in his native San Francisco Bay Area—in 1955–56 before leaving pro baseball.

References

External links

1931 births
2016 deaths
American military personnel of the Korean War
Baseball players from San Francisco
Chicago White Sox players
Colorado Springs Sky Sox (WL) players
Major League Baseball third basemen
Memphis Chickasaws players
Oakland Oaks (baseball) players
San Antonio Missions players
San Francisco Seals (baseball) players
Waterloo White Hawks players